Stefano Carobbi (born 16 January 1964)  is an Italian association football manager and former player, who played as a defender, in the role of full-back. In 2014, he was the manager of Colligiana in Serie D.

Club career
Carobbi had three separate spells with Fiorentina throughout his career. Despite competition from legendary defenders such as Maldini, Baresi, Costacurta and Tassotti, he also played two seasons (1989–91) with A.C. Milan, winning the 1990 European Cup, two European Super Cups, and two Intercontinental Cups during an extremely successful period in the club's history under manager Arrigo Sacchi. He also played for Lecce.

International career
Carobbi won seven caps for Italy U-21, and was part of Italy's team at the 1988 Olympics which finished in 4th place after being eliminated in the semi-finals of the competition.

Managerial career
In the 2012–13 season, he managed FiesoleCaldine in the Serie D; in 2014 he took on the role of Colligiana's head coach.

Honours

Club
Milan
European Cup: 1989–90
European Super Cup: 1989, 1990
Intercontinental Cup: 1989, 1990

References

1964 births
Living people
Italian footballers
Italy under-21 international footballers
Olympic footballers of Italy
Footballers at the 1988 Summer Olympics
Serie A players
Serie C players
ACF Fiorentina players
A.C. Milan players
U.S. Lecce players
Association football defenders
Serie A (women's football) managers